VfL Wolfsburg had a solid season, in which it just finished inside the top 10. It scored 57 goals in just 34 games, but also conceded 49, which was too much in order to challenge for European places.

Players

First-team squad
Squad at end of season

Left club during season

Results

Bundesliga

Top Scorers
  Tomislav Marić 12
  Diego Klimowicz 10
  Robson Ponte 8
  Martin Petrov 6

References

VfL Wolfsburg Results Soccerbase.com

VfL Wolfsburg seasons
Wolfsburg